Diaphus suborbitalis is a species of lanternfish found in the Indo-Western Pacific Ocean.

Size

References

Myctophidae
Taxa named by Max Carl Wilhelm Weber
Fish described in 1913